Gomphroa is a genus of small air-breathing land snails, terrestrial pulmonate gastropod mollusks in the family Azecidae.

Species 
Species in the genus Gomphroa include:
 Gomphroa bisacchii (Giusti, 1970)
 Gomphroa boissii (Dupuy, 1851)
 Gomphroa cylindracea (Calcara, 1840)
 Gomphroa dohrni (Paulucci, 1882)
 Gomphroa emiliana (Bourguignat, 1859)
 Gomphroa etrusca (Paulucci, 1886)
 Gomphroa incerta (Bourguignat, 1859)
 Gomphroa remyi (O. Boettger, 1949)
 Gomphroa zirjensis (Štamol, Manganelli, Barbato & Giusti, 2018)

References

External links
 Westerlund, C. A. (1903). Methodus dispositionis Conchyliorum extramarinorum in regione palaearctica viventium, familias, genera, subgenera et stirpes sistens. Rada Jugoslavenske Akademije Znanosti i Umjetnosti. 151 ["1902"]: 82-139, Zagreb. (Actis Academiae Scientiarum et Artium Slavorum Meridionalium) 
 Manganelli, G., Barbato, D., Pieńkowska, J. R., Benocci, A.; Lesicki, A. & Giusti, F. (2019). Unravelling the tangle of the azecid land snails: a survey on the supraspecific systematics based on comparative morphology and molecular phylogeny (Gastropoda: Eupulmonata: Orthurethra). Folia Malacologica. 27(4): 253-291

Azecidae